α5β1, also known as the fibronectin receptor, is an integrin that binds to matrix macromolecules and proteinases and thereby stimulates angiogenesis.  It is composed of α5 (ITGA5/CD49e) and β1 (ITGB1/CD29) subunits. It is the primary receptor for fibronectin. The interaction of VLA-5 with fibronectin plays an important role in regulating inflammatory cytokine production by human articular chondrocytes (From the Cell Migration Gateway ITGA5 ITGB1).

α5β1-integrin is transported inside the cell by the kinesin KIF1C, a kinesin-3 organelle transporter that walks along microtubules.

References

External links 
 
ITGA5 ITGB1 Info with links in the Cell Migration Gateway

Integrins